The Last Great Record of the 20th Century is an album by the American band the Scholars, released in 1998. It contains all eight songs from their previous release, I'm In a Band, as well as various demos and live tracks. It is out of print.

Track listing
 "I Love Guys In Bands" – 3:06
 "David Gonzalez" – 3:19
 "I Want My Girlfriend Back" – 3:19
 "Superdollar" – 3:46*
 "Tom & Jerry" – 2:53
 "W.T (The No Fear Polka)." – 1:53
 "I'm In A Band..." – 3:21
 "Girl's Best Friend (Acoustic)" – 4:29
 "I'm Done" – 2:57
 "Answering Machine" – 2:21
 "Girl's Best Friend (Electric) – 3:35
 "Lost In Rossmoor / Stupid Arguments / Tom & Jerry (Demo)" – 10:39
 "The Munsters Theme / Why Slit Your Wrists When You Can Carve Her Name Into Your Shoulder? / Stealin' From Dad (Demo)" – 7:21
 "The Power Rangers Theme / Stupid Arguments / Out To Patricia (Live)" – 7:50
 "I'm Done (Reunite)" – 4:07

Band members
Jesse Wilder – vocals, saxophone, keyboards
Scott Klopfenstein – trumpet, vocals
Grant Barry – trombone
Aaron Barrett – trombone
Jake Berrey – bass
John Sisk – guitar
Greg Parkin – drums
Jay Layafette – trumpet
Mike Barnhill – rhythm guitar

References

1998 albums